Graphiocephala barbitias is a moth of the family Gracillariidae. It is known from South Africa and Namibia.

The larvae feed on Euclea lanceolata. They probably mine the leaves of their host plant.

References

Gracillariinae
Moths of Africa
Insects of Namibia
Moths described in 1909